Vallenilla is a surname. Notable people with the surname include:

Ernesto Mayz Vallenilla (1925–2015), Venezuelan philosopher
Laureano Vallenilla Lanz (1870–1936), Venezuelan sociologist and politician
Luis Vallenilla (born 1974), Venezuelan footballer
Winston Vallenilla (born 1973), Venezuelan television presenter